Mahesh Bhupathi and Mark Knowles were the defending champions, but lost in the quarterfinals to Rik de Voest and Dmitry Tursunov.

Rik de Voest and Dmitry Tursunov won the final against Martin Damm and Robert Lindstedt, 4–6, 6–3, [10–5].

Seeds

Draw

Draw

External links
Draw

Dubai Tennis Championships - Men's Doubles
2009 Dubai Tennis Championships